Das Erbe der Guldenburgs ("The legacy of the Guldenburgs") is a German television series that originally aired on ZDF from 1987 to 1990 and revolves around the destiny of the Guldenburgs, a wealthy aristocratic family, and their nouveau riche enemies, the Balbecks.

While panned by critics during its original run, the show was very popular with the audience.
However, reviews have been more positive in recent years, acknowledging its strong female characters and juicy dialogues.

Plot
Martin Count von Guldenburg, head of an old aristocratic and seemingly wealthy dynasty known for its brewery, celebrates his 60th birthday on the family's estate north of Hamburg.

Shortly after, he dies in a car accident however, leaving behind his wife Christine with huge debts and the bitter realization that he had betrayed her with his Italian mistress Carina di Angeli for years. That relationship even produced an illegitimate son.

While Christine tries to save the family empire, she not only has to fight its worst enemies, the Balbecks, a nouveau riche clan owning a big brewery in   Hamburg, but also her stubborn mother-in-law Hertha, the dowager countess; her estranged stepson Thomas; and Achim Lauritzen, her dysfunctional stepdaughter Evelyn's shady husband.

Cast and Characters
Christiane Hörbiger as Christine Countess von Guldenburg
Brigitte Horney as Hertha Dowager Countess von Guldenburg (season 1-2)
Karl-Heinz Vosgerau as Martin Count von Guldenburg (pilot only)
Wolf Roth as Thomas Count von Guldenburg (season 1-2)
Iris Berben as Evelyn Lauritzen
Wilfried Baasner as Achim Lauritzen
Jochen Horst as Alexander 'Sascha' Count von Guldenburg (season 1-2)
Katharina Böhm as Susanne 'Nane' Countess von Guldenburg
Jürgen Goslar as Dr. Max von Guldenburg (season 1)
Ruth Maria Kubitschek as Margot Balbeck
Sigmar Solbach as Jan Balbeck
Susanne Uhlen as Kirsten 'Kitty' Balbeck
Friedrich Schütter as Kurt Kröger
Ingeborg Christiansen as Johanna Kröger
Alexander Wussow as Tobias Kröger
Sydne Rome as Carina di Angeli
Christopher Buchholz as Claudio Torres (season 3)
Stewart Granger as Jack Brinkley (season 1)
Ute Lemper as Peggy Brinkley (season 1)
Monika Peitsch as Aenne Günther
Karl Schönböck as Count Steinfeld
Friedrich von Thun as Johannes von Merungen (season 2-3)
Bernhard Wicki as Friedrich von Guldenburg (season 3)

Trivia
The majority of episodes were shot in Hamburg and Schleswig-Holstein, but filmimg also took place in other European countries and even Rio de Janeiro. While Wotersen Castle was used for exterior shots of the fictional Guldenburg Castle, a mansion later belonging to music producer Dieter Bohlen served as the backdrop for the Balbeck estate.
Brigitte Horney died only two days after finishing the filming of season 2. As she played one of the leading characters, scripts for season 3 had to be rewritten.
The show was a big ratings success for public network ZDF, garnering up to 18 million viewers, and is considered one of its last blockbusters before the rise of privately owned networks in Germany.

See also
List of German television series

External links
 

German television soap operas
Television shows set in Hamburg
1987 German television series debuts
1990 German television series endings
German-language television shows
ZDF original programming